Zoltán Kőszegi (born 1964) is a Hungarian politician, member of the National Assembly (MP) from Fidesz Pest County Regional List from 2010 to 2014.

He is the current Mayor of Dabas since 1998. Kőszegi was a member of the Committee on Foreign Affairs from 14 May 2010 to 28 February 2011 and of the Committee on Education, Science and Research from 14 February 2011 to 5 March 2012. He worked in the Committee of National Cohesion since 1 January 2011. He was appointed a member of the Committee on Human Rights, Minority, Civic and Religious Affairs on 5 March 2012.

Personal life
He is married and has four children.

References

1964 births
Living people
Fidesz politicians
Members of the National Assembly of Hungary (2010–2014)
Mayors of places in Hungary
People from Dabas, Hungary